Cruindmelus, aka Crundmáel, Irish monk and teacher, fl. first half of 9th century.

Overview

Cruindmelus was one of many Irish teachers on mainland Europe who were favoured by Charlemagne. Others included Clement of Ireland, Dungal of Bobbio and Donatus of Fiesole.

See also

 Hiberno-Latin

External links
 The New Cambridge Bibliography of English Literature  by George Watson.

9th-century Irish writers
Irish expatriates in France
Irish Christian monks
9th-century Latin writers